Garrett Phelan (born 1965) is an artist from Dublin, Ireland. He has developed a distinctive art practice that directly engages the audience with immersive ambitious site-specific drawing projects, independent FM radio broadcasts, sculptural installations, photography and animation.

Life and work

Phelan was born in Dublin, Ireland in 1965. He cites himself as a self-taught artist. He received most of his education as an artist by working in gallery administration and exhibition installation before he committed himself to becoming an artist. He was assistant director of The Hendrick's Gallery, Dublin from 1986 to 1988. He was Gallery and Studio Director of Temple Bar Gallery & Studios from 1988 to 1991. From 1991 to 1995 he was supervising technical mediator at the Irish Museum of Modern Art.

In 1994 he began producing art. He worked mainly in the area of Sound/Radio and Art from a visual arts perspective but usually incorporated photography and video into the work. He co-initiated the first high-end formal sound workshops in Ireland for visual artists in collaboration with The Sculpture Society of Ireland and Bowe Lane Recording studios. He co-produced the first dedicated intermittent independent FM Art Radio station in Ireland entitled A.A.R.T. – Radio in 1994. This was broadcast from the Irish Museum of Modern Art in a group survey exhibition entitled 'From Beyond the Pale'. He has continued to work independently on creating large scale FM/online radio broadcast experiments, significant projects include; Black Brain Radio, HEED FM and FREE THOUGHT FM.

In 1997 Phelan began working Solo. Since then he has exhibited widely in Ireland and internationally, most recently at the Douglas Hyde Gallery, The National Gallery of Ireland, Project Arts Centre, Irish Museum of Modern Art.  He has also exhibited at Proa Fundacion, Buenos Aires, Argentina; the 11th Lyon Biennial, France; 4th Auckland Triennial, New Zealand; SMART Project Space, Amsterdam; ICA, London; Fruitmarket Gallery, Edinburgh; Kunstverein, Hannover; Art Statements, Basel 39; Manifesta 5.

Selected solo exhibitions
FREE THOUGHT FM - Archive (2019)
FREE THOUGHT FM, The Douglas Hyde Gallery, Dublin, Ireland (2019)
I HAVE NO RIGHT TO BE SO NEAR, National Gallery of Ireland, Ireland (2017/2018)
HEED OFFICE, Ireland (2017)
THE HIDE PROJECT, Fingal County Council, Dublin, Ireland (2017 -)
HEED FM - ARCHIVE (2017)
HEED FM, ART 2016, The Arts Council of Ireland, Ireland (2016)
A VOODOO FREE PHENOMENON, The Project Arts Centre, Dublin, Ireland (2015)
OUR UNION ONLY IN TRUTH, Temple Bar Gallery and Studios, Dublin, Ireland (2013)
Irish Museum of Modern Art, Dublin, Ireland (2012)
Context Gallery, Derry, Northern Ireland (2011)
SMART Project Space, Amsterdam, Netherlands(2010)
Dublin City Gallery The Hugh Lane, Dublin, Ireland (2008)
Lewis Glucksman Gallery, Cork, Ireland (2008)
Art Statements; Art Basel 39, Switzerland (2008)
Kunst Radio, ORF Radio, Austria (2008)
Middlesbrough Institute of Modern Art, United Kingdom (2008)
Temple Bar Gallery and Studios, Dublin, Ireland (2006)
Firstsite, Colchester, United Kingdom (2006)

References

External links
Garrett Phelan Official website

Irish installation artists
Irish contemporary artists
Living people
New media artists
Sound artists
1965 births